The discography of Charlie Brown Jr. consists of ten studio albums, six video albums, three live albums, one extended play, one compilation and one demo tape. The band was formed in Santos, São Paulo in 1992 from the ashes of What's Up, a former project of vocalist Chorão that, by the time of its demise, already had in its line-up bassist Champignon, guitarists Marcão Britto and Thiago Castanho, and drummer Renato Pelado. In 1994 they released their first demo and Champignon sent it to record producer Tadeu Patolla, who in his turn showed it to his friend Rick Bonadio; Bonadio then secured the band a contract with Virgin Records and their debut, Transpiração Contínua Prolongada, came out in 1997.

Castanho left the band in 2001, after the release of their third album Nadando com os Tubarões, and they continued as a quartet until Tamo Aí na Atividade, when a series of creative divergences prompted the departure of its entire line-up. After a brief hiatus, Chorão reactivated the band in 2005 with Heitor Gomes on bass, André Pinguim on drums and Castanho returning as guitarist. Pinguim's contract expired in 2008, after which he was replaced by Bruno Graveto, and in 2011, following the departure of Gomes, Champignon and Marcão Britto returned to make Charlie Brown Jr. a quintet again.

While the band was working on their tenth studio album, La Familia 013, Chorão, who had always struggled with substance abuse, died due to a cocaine overdose on March 6, 2013, effectively ending the group's activities. Six months later, on September 9, Champignon committed suicide by firearm following increasing bouts of anxiety and depression. The album, eventually their last, was released posthumously on October 8.

On July 13, 2021, the live album Chegou Quem Faltava, originally recorded during a 2011 show, received a posthumous release through Sony Music.

References 

Charlie Brown Jr.
Latin music discographies
Rock music discographies
Rap rock discographies
Alternative rock discographies